Soledad Román de Núñez (born Soledad Román Polanco; October 6, 1835 - June 19, 1924) was the First lady of Colombia in 1880–82, 1884–88 and 1892, by her marriage to president Rafael Núñez. She is considered to have wielded a considerable influence in policy and participated in state affairs in Colombia during the presidencies of her spouse more than any other woman in Colombia before her. She is credited with the victory of the government in the conflict of 1885, as well as the concordat of 1887 (Colombia). She was a controversial figure, because her marriage was not recognized by the Catholic church, as the wedding had been civil, as her spouse's first wife was still alive and he was still married to her in the eyes of the Catholic church.

References

1835 births
1924 deaths
First ladies of Colombia
19th-century Colombian people